Benoît Lwamba (19 July 1945 – 17 January 2022) was a Congolese magistrate.

Biography
He was First President of the Court of Cassation of the Democratic Republic of the Congo from 2003 to 2008 and subsequently President of the Constitutional Court of the Democratic Republic of the Congo from 2015 to 2020. Lwamba died in Brussels on 17 January 2022, at the age of 76.

References

1945 births
2022 deaths
Democratic Republic of the Congo judges
People from Katanga Province